Naldha Mauvhog Union is a Union Parishad under Fakirhat Upazila of Bagerhat District in the division of Khulna, Bangladesh. It has an area of 60.37 km2 (23.31 sq mi) and a population of 19,686.

References

Unions of Fakirhat Upazila
Unions of Bagerhat District
Unions of Khulna Division